Major-General John Cecil Russell  (1839-1908) was a British cavalry officer.  After a brief service with the Oxford University Rifle Volunteer Corps Russell purchased a commission in the 11th Light Dragoons in 1860.  He transferred to the 10th Light Dragoons and rose to the rank of captain by purchase before transferring to the 12th Lancers in 1872.  Russell served with Garnet Wolseley in the 1873–1874 Anglo-Ashanti War and was considered a member of the Wolseley ring of rising men.  In 1875 he was appointed an Equerry in Waiting to Edward, Prince of Wales and became an Extra Equerry in 1878.

Russell served in Southern Africa in action against the Pedi King Sekhukhune and through his connections received a post with the British forces for the Anglo-Zulu War of 1879, with the local rank of lieutenant-colonel.  The British commander,  Lord Chelmsford, appointed Russell to command the mounted contingent of the main Central Column, angering some colonial troops who wanted to be commanded by a local man.  Russell commanded the mounted contingent in the Action at Sihayo's Kraal and, on the day of the defeat at the Battle of Isandlwana was away with Chelmsford on a reconnaissance party.  Russell was afterwards reassigned to Evelyn Wood's Left Column.  He led a force at the 28 March Battle of Hlobane but was criticised for his perceived abandonment of a force under Redvers Buller who were attacked by the Zulu.  In the following day's Battle of Kambula Russell had to be rescued by his sub-ordinate Lieutenant Edward Browne, who won the Victoria Cross.  Russell was accused of cowardice by Browne and Buller refused to ever serve with him again.  Wood recommended that he be removed from operations and Chelmsford assigned him to the remount depot in the rear.

Russell returned to his regiment in 1880 and served with them in India.  He became a major-general in 1895 and retired in 1898.  When Edward acceded to the throne in 1901 Russell became an Extra Equerry to the king and was appointed  a Commander of the Royal Victorian Order in 1902.

Early career 
John Cecil Russell was born in 1839.  He enlisted in the Oxford University Rifle Volunteer Corps and reached the rank of colour-serjeant before being commissioned as an ensign on 1 March 1860.  Russell resigned his commission in the Rifle Volunteer Corps on 19 June 1860.

Russell purchased a commission as a cornet in the 11th Light Dragoons on 18 September 1860.  He transferred to the 10th Light Dragoons on 16 October 1860.  Russell's regiment became the 10th (The Prince of Wales's Own) Royal Hussars in 1861 and he was appointed an instructor of musketry on 28 June 1864.  He purchased a lieutenant's commission in the regiment on 16 August 1864 and, on 18 October, was appointed adjutant.  Russell purchased his captaincy on 28 May 1870.

Russell transferred to the 12th Lancers on 3 August 1872.  Russell served under Garnet Wolseley in the 1873–1874 Anglo-Ashanti War.  Russell served as aide-de-camp to Sir Archibald Alison, 1st Baronet and was present during the Battle of Amoaful, the Battle of Ordashu and the capture of Kumasi.  He was considered to be a member of the Wolseley ring of rising officers associated with that commander.  Russell was rewarded for his service in the Ashanti war by a mention in dispatches and promotion to the brevet rank of major on 1 April 1874.  He was appointed an Equerry in Waiting to Edward, Prince of Wales on 1 March 1875.  He resigned the post on 5 July 1878 but was retained by Edward in the honorary role of Extra Equerry.  Russell was sent to the Transvaal on special duties in 1878 and fought against the Pedi King Sekhukhune.

Zulu War

Appointment 
Through his royal connections and his friendship with Lieutenant-General Frederic Thesiger (soon to become Lord Chelmsford), Russell gained a place with the British forces for the 1879 Anglo-Zulu War.  Although he had no experience of leading cavalry in action Chelmsford arranged for him to be granted the local rank of lieutenant-colonel and placed him in command of the mounted component of the British forces with Chelmsford's Centre Column, the principal force for the invasion of Zululand.  

The Centre Column's mounted component included around 100 regulars of the Imperial Mounted Infantry, consisting of men with riding experience from the infantry.  This force had been led for some time by Lieutenant Edward Browne of the 24th Regiment of Foot who was well-liked and his sub-ordination to Russell caused resentment among the men of the unit.  The majority of the mounted component was formed of units raised by the colonial government of Natal.  These men had expected to be commanded by John Dartnell of the Natal Mounted Police, a former British Army major and Indian Mutiny veteran turned Natal farmer.  The colonial volunteers, who had no obligation to serve outside of Natal, had agreed join Chelmsford's forces on the condition that they approved of their commander.  When Russell was appointed all of the officers of the Natal Mounted Police handed in their resignations in protest.  The controversy was reported by the press in Pietermaritzburg, causing embarrassment for Chelmsford.  Chelmsford's solution was to declare that Dartnell was invaluable to him as a personal advisor and to appoint him to a position on his staff.  The Natal Mounted Police officers rescinded their resignations when Dartnell asked them to do so as a personal favour to him.

First invasion 
Russell commanded the Imperial Mounted Infantry in the first action of the war, the 12 January 1879 Action at Sihayo's Kraal, defeating a small Zulu force.  Three days later, while engineers improved the road to ease the progress of the column inland Russell commanded a scouting part seeking the next camp site.  He reported back that the plain at Isandlwana provided good sources of water and firewood and Chelmsford determined upon it as his next camp site.

On 22 January Russell accompanied a portion of the column under Chelmsford on a reconnaissance in force to Mangeni.  The Natal irregulars were pleased when Dartnell was placed in charge of the mounted men with the force.    Russell instead had command of just the Imperial Mounted Infantry.  Whilst the force was out of the camp the portion remaining were attacked by the Zulu and wiped out in the Battle of Isandlwana.

Russell's squadron discovered a Zulu force on Isipezi Hill, which lay between Chelmsford's party and the camp.  He withdrew without engaging around noon and received word from Commandant George Hamilton-Browne of the Natal Native Contingent that he could see the camp was under attack.  Russell shortly afterwards rode to Chelmsford to pass on this report.  Chelmsford ordered him to press on and report the condition of the camp.  Russell did so and reported around 7,000 victorious Zulus in the wreckage of the camp.  Chelmford's force formed up into line and retook the camp, unopposed, later that evening.  Russell's force was posted to the right flank.

After spending an uneasy night on the battlefield Chelmsford's force moved back into Natal to the British supply post at Rorke's Drift.  Unsure if it had been lost to a Zulu attack Russell led the Imperial Mounted Infantry forwards to investigate.  Finding the post in British hands he was among the first group to enter the position  Russell rode on to confirm that the supply base at Helpmekaar, further the rear, remained in British hands.  He was stationed at Helpmekaar with responsibility for co-ordinating mounted patrols of the frontier but grew disinterested in the work.  Russell's patrols were sporadic and ill-planned and the staff officer Major Francis Clery criticised Russell for allowing the Zulus to roam at will.

Hlobane and Kambula 
After Isandlwana Chelmsford requested reinforcements before attempting a second invasion.  During the pause in operations Russell was sent, in command of the squadron of Imperial Mounted Infantry, in March 1879 to the Left Column under Evelyn Wood at Kambula.  On 14 March Wood sent his sub-ordinate, Redvers Buller, commanding a force of irregular horse,  into Zululand to rescue around 1,000 dependents of a Zulu chief, uHamu, who had defected to the British.  The following day Russell road out with his mounted infantry and some mules to help transport the women and children into the British camp.  

In late March Wood ordered an attack on Hlobane, a mountain stronghold of the AbaQulusi Zulu clan.  This resulted in the 28 March Battle of Hlobane.  Russell left camp at 4 am that morning with a party of 640 men, largely mounted. Reaching the mountain around dawn Wood's orders were for Russell to ascend the Ntendeka Mountain, to the west, and to pass onto Hlobane by the Devil's Pass, connecting the two.  Buller's men were to ascend on the east of the mountain.  On reaching Devil's Pass Russell considered it impassable and sent a messenger to Buller to warn him of his.  Russell's men were seizing Zulu cattle on Ntendeka when they spotted the main Zulu army approaching and sent a message to Buller.

The Zulu cut off the eastern side of Hlobane so Buller's men were forced to use Devil's Pass as an escape route.  Russell meanwhile, despite a request for support from Buller, had withdrawn to the base of Ntendeka.  Wood ordered Russell to move to "Zunguin Nek", from where he could cover Buller's retreat.  Wood meant the saddle of land connecting Hlobane to Zungwini Mountain but Russell misinterpreted the location as the nek connecting Zunngwini to Kambula moountain,  further to the west and of no use to Buller.  Without support Buller's men were harried closely through Devil's Pass, suffering heavy casualties before reaching Russell's force and retreating to Kambula.  Russell's quick retreat had also left behind his African foot auxiliaries, 80 of whom were killed.

That day the Zulu attacked the British camp in the Battle of Kambula and were repulsed.  Russell participated in the action.  The mounted contingent were ordered to provoke the Zulus into attacking the camp and rode to within  to open fire.  When the Zulu charged some men struggled to remount in time to escape.  Russell rode to the aid of a trooper of the Frontier Light Horse but found himself also dismounted.  Russell was saved by Browne whilst the trooper was rescued by men of the Natal Native Horse.  Browne received the Victoria Cross for this act. 

In his formal report on the battle of Hlobane Wood criticised Russell's actions and came close to accusing him of cowardice.  Buller, and Browne who was with his party, were furious with Russell. On the day of the Battle of Kambula Russell apologised to Buller, saying: "you are quite right.  My metier is not South African fighting". Buller told Russell he would never serve on a joint operation with him again.  After the Battle of Kambula Browne handed a  letter to Wood denouncing Russell for cowardice at Hlobane and stating that he and his men would never serve under him again.  Wood wrote to Chelmsford recommending that Russell be removed from operations and assigned to the remount depot in the rear at Pietermaritzburg , this was approved.

For his service in the war Russell was appointed to the brevet rank of lieutenant-colonel on 29 November 1879.

Later career 
Russell returned to his regiment in his substantive rank of captain 8 May 1880.  He was promoted to major on 5 June 1880 and later served with them in India.  Russell was promoted to colonel on 7 February 1884 and to major-general 26 March 1895.  He retired from the army in 1898.

Upon Edward's accession to the throne Russell was, on  22 February 1901, appointed as an Extra Equerry to the king.  He was appointed to the honorary position of Colonel of the Regiment of the 12th Lancers on 2 April 1902.  Russell was appointed a Commander of the Royal Victorian Order on 9 November 1902, appointments to the order are the personal gift of the monarch.  Russell died in 1909.

References

Sources 

1839 births
1908 deaths
British military personnel of the Third Anglo-Ashanti War
British military personnel of the Anglo-Zulu War
British Army major generals
11th Hussars officers
10th Royal Hussars officers
12th Royal Lancers officers